Desmiphora lateralis is a species of beetle in the family Cerambycidae. It was described by Thomson in 1868. It is known from Brazil, Uruguay, and Paraguay.

References

Desmiphora
Beetles described in 1868